Nareshindra Bhardwaj (born 1959) is a Canadian politician, who was elected in the 2008 provincial election to represent the electoral district of Edmonton-Ellerslie in the Legislative Assembly of Alberta. He is a member of the Progressive Conservatives. and was Associate Minister of Persons with Disabilities in the cabinet of Jim Prentice.

Bhardwaj ran 2012 provincial election as an incumbent PC candidate, winning a second term on April 23, 2012. He did not run in the 2015 general election.

He was made Associate Minister of Persons with disabilities in 2013.

Controversy

Bhardwaj has been accused of offering a $10,000 bribe to prevent other candidates from challenging him in an election. Rachel Notley, leader of the Alberta New Democratic Party, requested that Bhardwaj step down and submit to an investigation. Although cleared by an internal PC party investigation, Bhardwaj remained the subject of a criminal investigation. In March 2015 he withdrew his name as a candidate for the May 5, 2015 general election.

Electoral history

References 

Progressive Conservative Association of Alberta MLAs
Living people
1959 births
Place of birth missing (living people)
Date of birth missing (living people)
21st-century Canadian politicians
Canadian politicians of Indian descent